Mamadou Doudou Diouf (born 15 September 1990) is a Senegalese professional footballer.

Career

Early career
Diouf played college soccer at the University of Connecticut between 2010 and 2013. In total Diouf scored 36 goals and added 10 assists in 74 career appearances with the Huskies.

Vancouver Whitecaps FC
On 16 January 2014 Diouf was selected second round (30th overall) of the 2014 MLS SuperDraft by the Vancouver Whitecaps FC. He signed with Vancouver and was loaned out to their USL Pro affiliate Charleston Battery in March 2014. Diouf made his professional debut on 22 March 2014 and scored in a 1–1 draw against Orlando City.

References

External links 
 

1990 births
Living people
Senegalese footballers
Senegalese expatriate footballers
UConn Huskies men's soccer players
Vancouver Whitecaps FC players
Charleston Battery players
Association football forwards
Expatriate soccer players in the United States
Expatriate soccer players in Canada
Expatriate footballers in Finland
Vancouver Whitecaps FC draft picks
USL Championship players
Senegalese expatriate sportspeople in Canada
Senegalese expatriate sportspeople in the United States
Senegalese expatriate sportspeople in Finland